Bread and Roses is a 2000 film directed by Ken Loach, starring Pilar Padilla, Adrien Brody and Elpidia Carrillo. The plot deals with the struggle of poorly paid janitorial workers in Los Angeles and their fight for better working conditions and the right to unionize. It is based on the "Justice for Janitors" campaign of the Service Employees International Union (SEIU).

The film is critical of inequalities in the United States. Health insurance in particular is highlighted and it is also stated in the film that the pay of cleaners and other low paying jobs has declined in recent years.

The film's name, "Bread and Roses", derives from the 1912 textile strike in Lawrence, Massachusetts. Though the phrase comes from a 1911 poem by James Oppenheim (which was, in turn, based on a speech given by Rose Schneiderman), it is commonly associated with the Lawrence strike, which united dozens of immigrant communities, led to a large extent by women, under the leadership of the Industrial Workers of the World.

Cast

Uncredited party guests

Production

The following companies produced the film:
British Screen
BSkyB
Cineart
Filmcooperative Zürich
Parallax Pictures
BiM Distribution
Alta Films
BAC Films
Road Movies Filmproduktion
Tornasol Films

Awards and nominations
The film was nominated for the Palme d'Or (Golden Palm) at the 2000 Cannes Film Festival and won the Jury Award at the Temecula Valley International Film Festival in 2000.

In 2001, it was nominated for the Artios award of the Casting Society of America, for the British Independent Film Awards for Best British Independent Film, Best Director and Best Screenplay, and won the Phoenix Prize at the Santa Barbara International Film Festival.

In 2002, it was nominated for four ALMA Awards, of which it won the Outstanding Supporting Actress in a Motion Picture (Elpidia Carrillo) and also won the Imagen Award for Best Theatrical Feature Film of the Imagen Foundation Awards.

References

External links
 The Bread-and-Roses-strike
 
 
 
 

2000 films
2000 drama films
African-American drama films
British drama films
2000s English-language films
Films scored by George Fenton
Films about the labor movement
Drama films based on actual events
Films directed by Ken Loach
Films set in Los Angeles
Films set in Mexico
Films shot in Los Angeles
Films shot in San Diego
German drama films
English-language German films
British independent films
Spanish drama films
English-language Spanish films
2000s Spanish-language films
Swiss drama films
English-language Swiss films
German independent films
Spanish independent films
2000s American films
2000s British films
2000s German films